Harry McCormick (Bayonne, New Jersey, 1942) is a contemporary American painter noted for his closely observed renderings of shadow, light, and reflections in interior spaces.  His paintings often capture one or two solitary individuals in moments of introspection.  He was born in New Jersey on June 12, 1942, and is primarily self-taught as an artist.

Museums and collections
Birmingham Museum of Art, Alabama
Boca Raton Museum of Art, Boca Raton, Florida
Charles B Goddard Art Center, Ardmore, Oklahoma
Canton Art Institute, Canton Ohio
Griffith Art Center, Canton, Ohio
Jesse Besser Museum, Michigan
Mr. Mel Brooks and Ms. Anne Bancroft
Fairleigh Dickinson University, Rutherford, NY
Newark Museum, New Jersey
Smithsonian Institution, Washington, DC
St. Mary's College of Maryland
Syracuse University Collection, Syracuse, NY
University of Southern Illinois
Wichita State University Collection, Kansas
Vatican Collection, Rome, Italy

References

External links
 Harry McCormick Studios

20th-century American painters
American male painters
21st-century American painters
21st-century American male artists
1942 births
Living people
20th-century American male artists